John Hill (22 September 1930 – 26 August 2002) was a New Zealand cricketer. He played eight first-class matches for Otago between 1961 and 1963.

Hill was a left-arm medium-pace bowler who played most of his senior cricket for Southland. In Southland's match against the touring West Indian team in 1955–56, he took 8 for 55 in the first innings. A year later, against the touring Australians, he took four of the six wickets that fell in the Australians' only innings. In his first-class career his best figures came in his last match, for an Otago Invitation XI against the touring MCC in March 1963, when he took figures of 25–8–61–4; nevertheless, the MCC team won by an innings.

Hill's son Robbie also played for Otago and Southland.

See also
 List of Otago representative cricketers

References

External links
 

1930 births
2002 deaths
New Zealand cricketers
Otago cricketers
People from Gore, New Zealand